Ganga Gowri is a 1997 Indian Tamil-language romantic comedy film directed by Madheswaran. The film stars Arun Kumar, Sangita, and Mantra while Vadivelu, Dindigul I. Leoni, and Siva play supporting roles. It was released on 11 September 1997.

Plot 

Shiva and his brother Vichu are carefree youths, while their father Pandiyan is a miser. Shiva falls in love with Ganga at first sight and tries to seduce her with Vichu's help. Ultimately, Ganga also falls in love with him. Gowri comes from her village and begins to work in Pandiyan's house as a maid. A few months ago, Shiva was bitten by a snake, and Muthu saved him. Muthu cannot marry Gowri because of their horoscope. According to tradition, Gowri must marry another man for a week and then can marry Muthu. Shiva, grateful to Muthu for saving his life, married her and left the village. Thereafter, Gowri did not want to marry Muthu anymore. Muthu understood and advised her to rejoin Shiva. Finally, Pandiyan accepts the marriage of Shiva and Ganga. What transpires later forms the crux of the story.

Cast 

Arun Kumar as Shiva
Sangita as Gowri
Mantra as Ganga
Vadivelu as Vichu
Dindigul I. Leoni as Pandiyan
Siva as Muthu
Pandu
Vichu Viswanath
Peeli Sivam
Sirpy in a guest appearance

Soundtrack 
The music was composed by Sirpy, with lyrics written by Pazhani Bharathi.

Reception 
Ji of Kalki wrote .

References

External links 

1990s Tamil-language films
1997 films
1997 romantic comedy films
Films scored by Sirpy
Indian romantic comedy films